The 1965 St. Louis Cardinals season was the team's 46th year in the National Football League (NFL) and their sixth season in St. Louis. After losing the season opener in Philadelphia, the Cardinals reeled off four consecutive wins to move into a tie with the Cleveland Browns at 4–1 after five weeks. However, the Cardinals lost their final six games to finish in sixth place at 5–9, ahead of only the 2–12 Pittsburgh Steelers in the NFL Eastern Conference.

It was the final season at Busch Stadium, formerly known as Sportsman's Park. Head coach Wally Lemm resigned after the 1965 season and returned to his previous position with the Houston Oilers of the AFL. The Cardinals moved to the new Busch Memorial Stadium for the 1966 season.

Offseason

NFL Draft 
In November 1964, the Cardinals selected quarterback Joe Namath of Alabama in the first round of the 1965 NFL Draft, but he signed a record contract with the New York Jets of the American Football League. It was the height of the bidding war between the leagues, which subsided with the merger announcement in June 1966.

Regular season

Schedule

Standings

References

External links 
 1965 St. Louis Cardinals at Pro-Football-Reference.com

St. Louis
Arizona Cardinals seasons